Biostar Microtech International Corp. is a Taiwanese company which designs and manufactures computer hardware products such as motherboards, video cards, expansion cards, thermal grease, headphones, home theater PCs, remote controls, desktops, barebone computers, system-on-chip solutions and industrial PCs.

Awarded Taiwan's Top 20 Global Brand in 2008, Biostar, with an estimated brand value of US$46 million, was ranked No. 1 as the top motherboard brand for internet cafés in China. Biostar is an independent company listed on the main floor of Taiwan Stock Market, stock ID number .

History
The company was founded in 1986, manufacturing XT form factor mainboards and in later years add-on cards.  In 1999 Biostar was listed on the Taiwan Stock Exchange & also certified ISO 9001 standard within the same year. Biostar has shifted from the SI/OEM market to the channel market with the portion of branded products closer to 100 percent.

On 1 August 2004, having already had a successful collaboration of Nvidia nForce based motherboards, Biostar announced it was to become a first tier partner with Nvidia of graphics solutions.

Biostar was the first manufacturer to launch a motherboard with built-in Wireless LAN back in May 2003, the P4TCA, which is based on at the time Intel's flagship i875P “Canterwood” chipset. Biostar introduced the first AM2/AM2+ motherboard in the world (TF560 A2+) in June 2007, which was able to host Socket AM2 Athlon 64  and AM2+ AMD Phenom processors.

Biostar was awarded “Top 20 Taiwan Global Brand” in 2008 conducted by Taiwan External Trade Development Council (TAITRA) with an estimate brand value of US$46 million. Only three companies had a chance to crack the Top 20 list for the first time – and Biostar was among them.

Biostar was also the first manufacturer in the world to launch a motherboard readily available with integrated USB 3.1 in February 2015, the Gaming Z97X, which is based on Intel's Z97 “Wildcat Point” chipset.

Biostar has the distinction of being the first to allow end-users to modify voltages and frequencies of the video card's GPU and memory to boost performance to extreme limits (overclocking). Those cards are either called "V-Ranger" or "V-Series".

Their mainboards, notably the "T-Power" and "T-Series", have been widely reviewed to be highly overclockable achieving world record FSB overclocks.

Products

ethOS
It's an operating system, a premium 64 bit linux distro for cryptocurrency mining motherboard rig, it mines Monero, Ethereum, etc. it was developed in 2016.

Mainboard chipset

Location
Biostar is located in New Taipei City, Taiwan and is represented in many continents throughout the world through its 5 regional headquarters.

See also

 List of companies of Taiwan
 ASRock
 Asus
 DFI
 Elitegroup Computer Systems (ECS)
 EVGA Corporation
 Gigabyte Technology
 Micro-Star International (MSI)

References

External links

Companies based in New Taipei
Electronics companies of Taiwan
Graphics hardware companies
Manufacturing companies established in 1986
Motherboard companies
Taiwanese brands
Taiwanese companies established in 1986